Sir Hugh Owen, 5th Baronet (?1731–86), of Orielton, Pembrokeshire, Wales was a Welsh politician who sat in the House of Commons  from 1770 to 1786.

Owen was the eldest son of Sir William Owen, 4th Baronet and educated at Newcome's School in Hackney, London. His father appointed him Colonel of the Pembrokeshire Militia when it was embodied in 1759. He succeeded his father as 5th baronet and to Orielton, Pembrokeshire in 1781.

He was the Member of Parliament (MP) for Pembrokeshire, 20 March 1770 – 16 January 1786.

He married Anne, the daughter of John Colby of Bletherston, and had one son and heir, Hugh, the 6th Baronet.

References

1731 births
1786 deaths
People educated at Newcome's School
Pembroke Militia officers
Members of the Parliament of Great Britain for Pembrokeshire
British MPs 1768–1774
British MPs 1774–1780
British MPs 1780–1784
British MPs 1784–1790
Baronets in the Baronetage of England